Gerlachovský štít (translated into English as Gerlachov Peak, German: Gerlsdorfer Spitze, Hungarian: Gerlachfalvi-csúcs), informally referred to as Gerlach, is the highest peak in the High Tatras, in Slovakia, and in the Carpathian Mountains. Its elevation is usually listed at 2654.4 m above mean sea level. The pyramidal shape of the massif is marked by a huge cirque.

Mistaken for an average mountain in the rugged High Tatras range in the more distant past, it has since played a symbolic role in the eyes of the rulers and populations of several Central European nations, to the point that between the 19th and mid-20th century, it had four different names with six name reversals. Due to geopolitical changes, it managed to be the highest mountain of the Kingdom of Hungary, and of Czechoslovakia, Slovakia and then Czechoslovakia again within the span of less than three decades of the 20th century.

Gerlachovský štít shares its geology and ecology with the rest of the High Tatras, but provides a worthwhile environment for biologists as the highest ground anywhere in Europe north of the parallel approximately linking Munich, Salzburg, and Vienna. With the travel restrictions imposed by the Eastern Bloc, the mountain was particularly treasured by Czechs, East Germans, Hungarians, Poles, and Slovaks as the loftiest point available for them to climb. Although local authorities have since restricted access to the peak, it continues to attract its share of visitors.

Names

Present 
Gerlachovský štít means the "Peak (of the village) of Gerlachov". The Slovak colloquial (unofficial) name is Gerlach. The Polish official names are Gerlach or Gierlach, while its Polish colloquial names are Girlach and Garłuch. The name of the village of Gerlachov itself is of German origin, because the Spiš region around the High Tatra Mountains in Slovakia used to be inhabited by German settlers for several centuries.

Past 
The peak's earliest recorded name was the Szepes-German Kösselberg (Cauldron Mountain) on a map from 1762. The Slovak name of the mountain was first recorded as Kotol, also meaning "Cauldron", in 1821. Both names referred to the peak's characteristic cauldron-like cirque.

The name that became common in travel books and other literature in the 19th century, however, is its current name, linking the mountain to the village of Gerlachov (Carpathian German: Gerlsdorf)) at its foot. It echoed the oldest known undifferentiated reference to the peaks on or near Gerlachov's municipal lands, Gerlachfalvenses montes (Latin with Hungarian elements for the "Gerlachov Village Mountains"), in a drawing of the High Tatras from 1717. It also paralleled the name Gerlsdorfer Spitze (Gerlachov Peak) used by the first person to identify it as the highest peak in the Tatras in 1838 (see below), which was rendered as gerlachovský chochol (Gerlach crest) in a Slovak version of his report in 1851. Several other mountains in the High Tatras have acquired their names from villages in the foothills.

Once it was determined that the mountain was the highest point in the region, the succession of the authorities that held control over it took an interest in its name and changed it periodically for symbolic reasons. In 1896, as part of Austria-Hungary, the highest peak of the Carpathians received its first government-sponsored name − after the contemporary head of state Emperor Francis Joseph I. Guidebooks sometimes did not catch up on these name changes. After the dissolution of the monarchy in 1918, the mountain continued to be known simply as Gerlachovský štít because it belonged to the village of Gerlachov. The Polish government, claiming the territory of the High Tatras for Poland, simultaneously called the mountain Szczyt Polski (Polish Peak), but never gained control over it. The new Czechoslovak government changed the name to Štít legionárov (Legionnaires Peak) in honor of the Czechoslovak Legions in 1923, but the name was dropped in favor of the earlier Gerlachovský štít in 1932. As a result of the Communist coup d'état in 1948, the mountain was renamed once more − to Stalinov štít (Stalin Peak) in 1949. Its traditional name Gerlachovský štít was restored yet again a decade later and has remained unchanged through the present.

History 

Gerlachovský štít was not always considered the highest mountain in the Tatras. After the first official measurement of peaks in the Tatras during the period of the Habsburg monarchy in the 18th century, Kriváň (2,494 m) was considered the highest. Other candidate peaks for the status of the highest mountain at that time were Lomnický štít (2,633 m) and Ľadový štít (2,627 m). The first person to accurately name Gerlachovský štít as the highest peak was the forester Ľudovít (Ludwig) Greiner in 1838. Greiner's measurement was formally confirmed by an Austrian Army survey party in 1868. However, it was generally accepted only after the Vienna Military Institute for Geography issued a new, authoritative collection of maps of Central Europe in ca. 1875.

The first confirmed ascent was made by Ján (Johann) Still from the village of Nová Lesná in 1834. In 1880, the routes through the Velická próba (Velická Challenge) and Batizovská próba (Batizovská Challenge) were secured by chains.

Access 

Only members of a national UIAA club are allowed to climb the peak on their own. Other visitors have to take a certified mountain guide. The two easiest routes, usually up the Velická próba and down the Batizovská próba named after their respective valleys, are protected by chains. Because of an exposed section along the Velická próba and tricky orientation especially on the ridge, both are among the more difficult scrambling routes in the High Tatras, although it is rather climbing, since there are many moments when one must rely on one's hands to hold one's bodyweight. With no snow, guidebooks grade the routes as a II or III climb (UIAA scale) or lower. More challenging is the route named Martinkova. The route begins at Poľský hrebeň and leads to the summit along the ridge, offering astonishing views. The Martinkova route has two main variants. The short version starts at Litvorové sedlo and is considered easier, because it skips the abseiling section from Velický štít. In general, using a rope is strongly advised on both variants, and the full version of the route is not possible without a rope.

In winter, Gerlachovský štít offers a challenging alpine climb, with mixed climbing and a risk of avalanches.

The unmarked trailhead is on the green-marked trail leading up Velická Valley near the southern edge of the first plateau (Kvetnica) above the Sliezsky Dom. The equally unmarked, indistinct route to Gerlach veers off north-west towards the mountain's eastern slopes at the elevation of c. , but occasional cairns begin to appear farther on. The fastest and easiest descent is down the Batizovská próba. Mountain guides always follow the route in the east–west direction, ascending from Velická Valley and descending into Batizovská Valley, in order to reduce logjams.

Two most popular multi-pitch routes for technical climbing are on the eastern and south-western walls. Both are exceptionally long and situated on solid granite walls. The best season for climbing is mid September to mid October or until the snow falls. Another good season lasts from late June to early August.

The route to Gerlachovský štít falls under the Tatra National Park ordinance, according to which hikers who depart from marked trails may be subject to fines unless they are UIAA members, or are led by an IFMGA-certified mountain guide. Camping is subject to similar restrictions. Rangers and some mountain guides are authorized to collect fines on the spot. Cairns that hikers build to mark the trail are periodically taken apart.

Conditions at the summit

View 
Like a 19th-century comment in a British guidebook, "impressive and picturesque", modern hikers usually appreciate the panoramic view of the highest and many other peaks in the High Tatras, from Kriváň in the west to Široká in the north and Lomnický štít in the east. Farther on, but often visible, are the eastern Low Tatras in the south and part of the Belianske Tatras in the east. Better than usual visibility, a rare occurrence except in the fall and winter, is needed to see the Stolické vrchy, Volovské vrchy, the Slovak Paradise region, and Branisko. Very rare are sights of Praděd or Polonynian Beskids. At 330 kilometers away it's theoretically possible to see Vlădeasa peak in Apuseni Mountains.

Hikers' reported enjoyment of the view is at least partly attributable to their awareness that they are at the highest point in all of northern and central Europe (Visegrád countries). Visibility is merely  or less on most summer afternoons because of the amount of water vapor in the air or because of cloudiness (fog). The view is partly blocked by the long ridge of Končistá in the west, areas near the mountain towards the south and north are obscured by the Gerlach massif itself. Several other summits in the High Tatras, including some with marked trails, offer views with precipitous drops, varied scenery, and wide vistas.

Weather 

The effects of high-altitude weather on those who ascend Gerlachovský štít may be more pronounced than its altitude alone. The temperature gradient between the Tatra mountain resorts and the summit can be steep. Low air temperature higher up can be masked by high insolation under clear skies, but will take its effect with increased cloud cover. Combined with windy conditions, the impact may be considerably detrimental even without rain or snow. The summit disappears in the clouds for periods of time on most days, which translates to fog at that elevation and possible disorientation as well as anxiety.

While temperatures are somewhat lower on Gerlachovský štít because of its elevation, the weather and its potential impact on visitors is little different from other summits in the High Tatras both with and without marked trails. The typical daily weather pattern in the summer is a clear morning, clouds gathering by mid-morning—noon, occasional showers and storms in the afternoon. The chance of rain is lowest between 9–10 am and peaks between 2–3 pm, with a drop-off after 6 pm. The frequency of storms with lightning (as opposed to rainstorms) on Gerlach's summit and on the other highest ridges is little different from lower elevations, too, but people exposed to wind, (sometimes freezing) rain, and lightning have greater difficulty to cope. The nearest shelter for those who ascend Gerlach is the Sliezsky Dom Hotel, there are no natural shelters along the route.

Climate

See also

Mountain Rescue Service (Slovakia)

References

External links 

 
 QTVR 360 degree panorama from the peak 
 Detailed descriptions of peaks in the High Tatras 
 Map of the area 

Mountains of Slovakia
Mountains of the Western Carpathians
Two-thousanders of Slovakia
Spiš
Cirques of Europe
High Tatras
Highest points of countries
De-Stalinization